PT Propadu Konair Tarahubun (PT PKT) is a subsidiary of Plantation Key Technology Group based in Medan, North Sumatra Indonesia. which is engaged in the manufacture of fertilizers. Since its establishment, PT PKT has been working on Integrated Conservation Program of Water, Soil, Air and Plantation which serves to incorporate models of sustainable development into every practice of plantation.

Members
  Roundtable on Sustainable Palm Oil
  Institute Of Nano Technology
  Biopesticide industry alliance
  International Competence centre for Organic Agriculture

Accreditation, Awards, and Certifications
 2005 – International Professional of the Year 2005 for the discovery of Dioxin Free System for the discovery of Dioxin Free from IBC Cambridge, England.
 2008 – ”Sistem Dioxin-Free” untuk pelestarian lingkungan hidup for the discovery of Dioxin Free System as the national pride of the invention to the world of Indonesian World Record Museum (Muri).

References

External links
Official Website
Vegalab Website

Fertilizer companies of Indonesia
Organic fertilizers
Agriculture companies of Indonesia
Indonesian brands